"Tip of My Tongue" is a song written by Lynsey de Paul and Barry Blue (originally registered as "On the Tip of My Tongue"). It was first released as the fifth single by Brotherly Love (a Liverpool-based group composed of three brothers, Mike, Ronnie and Lee Carroll, who are brothers of impressionist Faith Brown) with the song "I Love Everything About You" as the flip side on CBS Records in 1973 and was produced by Phil Wainman. According to music journalist James Craig, de Paul was in the audience for a Brotherly Love performance at Gulliver's and was so impressed with them that she co-penned "Tip of My Tongue" for them. The trio performed the song on the Granada TV programme Lift Off With Ayshea on 22 June 1973. The song received positive reviews from the British music press, and the brothers were interviewed about the single It made the UK chart breakers on 23 May 1973 but did not manage to enter the UK Singles Chart Barry Blue was credited as "Barry Green" on this release.

The female soul trio Ellie (aka the Hope Sisters - Ellie, Christine and Kathy) released their version of "Tip of My Tongue" produced by Barry Blue as a single (backed by "Someone's Stolen My Marbles") on the Fresh Air record label in the UK, on London Records in North America and on the Phillips label in Germany, France and Australia in 1974. They performed the song on the German TV music program, Hits a Go Go, on 22 October 1974. The song was also included on the German and Austrian releases of the 1975 compilation album Various – 26 Original Top Hits as well as on the French compilation albums "Hit-Parade Printemps Phonogram 1975 Spécial Discothèque" and "Alcazar D'été" on the Philips label. It was also chosen as record of the week by Dutch DJ Frans van der Drift at Radio Mi Amigo on 29 December 1974 and Canadian radio station CFSX by DJ Phil Smith. Ellie Hope went on to form Liquid Gold where she was the lead singer. Ellie's version of the song is still played on radio, for example on 1 November 2014 by the German independent radio station, Radio X, Frankfurter Stadtradio (FM 91,8).

The song's co-writer, Barry Blue, released his own recording of the song arranged by Gerry Shury and produced by Blue as an album track in 1974, and this version was later on the compilation albums Dancin' (On A Saturday Night)... Best Of as well as The Very Best of Barry Blue released in 2012. In 2021, Barry's recording of the song appeared on his 4CD compilation release "Out of the Blue - 50 years Discovery".

In 1977, the Canadian band, Great Rufus Road Machine (Sharon Russell (vocals), Ron Russell (vocals), John “The Fly” Baye (drums), Dirk Acree (bass, trumpet) and Ken LaDéroute (vocals, guitar)), a pop band from Kitchener, Ontario, recorded the song and released it as a single, with "Can't You Do It Now" as the B-side of the single. Both songs received major airplay success in Canada (131 stations) and the band performed "Tip of My Tongue" on Canadian TV. "Tip of My Tongue" was also included as the lead track on their self-named album.

The British band The Dooleys also recorded their version of the song as a track on their 1981 album, Secrets, which was suggested by the album's producer Barry Blue. The album was renamed The Dancer for its release in Japan and made number 41 on the Japanese Albums Chart. The Dooleys version of the song was finally released on CD in 2013 on the Full House / Secrets double album, on the album The Dooleys Greatest Hits, and also on the three CD compilation set, Gold, released in 2021. Brotherly Love's 1973 version of the song was finally released on CD in 2022, on a compilation entitled Bubblerock is Here to Stay Vol. 2: The British Pop Explosion 1970-73.

References

Songs written by Lynsey de Paul
Songs written by Barry Blue
1973 songs